Thierry Zaboitzeff is a French multi-instrumentalist and composer.

Biography
Zaboitzeff was born near Maubeuge, northern France in 1953.

In 1997, he left Art Zoyd in order to realize his own projects and began performing solo. In 1999, he established the band Zaboitzeff & Crew. After its breakup, he went on to lead the band Aria Primitva beginning in 2018.

Several of Zaboitzeff's compositions from 1984 were incorporated by Mavros Sedeño into the 2014 French art game NaissanceE.

See also 
 Kasper T. Toeplitz

References 

1953 births
Living people
French musicians